The Lawrence Brothers and Company Store (also known as the John Faunce General Store, as Geo. E. Edwards General Merchandise, as Ophir Mercantile Co., and as Morzenti Grocery & Beer Hall) is a historic commercial building in Ophir, Utah, United States, that is listed on the National Register of Historic Places.

Description
The building is located at East Main Street and was built in 1874.

It was listed on the National Register of Historic Places in 1980.

See als0

 National Register of Historic Places listings in Tooele County, Utah

References

See also

Commercial buildings on the National Register of Historic Places in Utah
Commercial buildings completed in 1874
Tooele County, Utah